Kocalar is a village in the Tunceli District, Tunceli Province, Turkey. The village is populated by Kurds of the Arel tribe and had a population of 21 in 2021.

References 

Villages in Tunceli District
Kurdish settlements in Tunceli Province